The 1973 WHA Amateur Draft was the first draft for the World Hockey Association.


Selections by round
Below are listed the selections in the 1973 WHA Amateur Draft.

Round 1

Round 2

Round 3

Round 4

Round 5

Round 6

Round 7

Round 8

Round 9

Round 10

Round 11

See also
1973 NHL Amateur Draft
1973–74 WHA season

References
1973 WHA Amateur Draft on Hockeydb.com

WHA Amateur Drafts
Draft